The 23rd Massachusetts General Court, consisting of the Massachusetts Senate and the Massachusetts House of Representatives, met in 1802 and 1803 during the governorship of Caleb Strong. David Cobb served as president of the Senate and John Coffin Jones served as speaker of the House.

Senators

 Peleg Coffin
 William Tudor

Representatives

 John C. Jones
 Samuel Parkman

See also
 7th United States Congress
 8th United States Congress
 List of Massachusetts General Courts

References

External links
 . (Includes data for state senate and house elections in 1802)
 
 

Political history of Massachusetts
Massachusetts legislative sessions
massachusetts
1802 in Massachusetts
massachusetts
1803 in Massachusetts